Dooniwari or Dooniwara is a village in Budgam district of the Indian union territory of Jammu and Kashmir, situated  away from Srinagar city and  away from Budgam town. Dooniwari has a total population of 1,839 citizens. There are about 278 houses in Dooniwari village as per 2011 census. Areas in its locality include Wathoora, Gopalpora, Chattergam, Kralapora and Bagati Kani Pora.

Dooniwari Data

Caste Factor
There is no population of Schedule Caste (SC) and Schedule Tribe(ST) in Dooniwari village of Badgam district.

Work Profile
In Dooniwari, out of total population, 601 were engaged in work activities. 58.07 % of workers describe their work as Main Work (Employment or Earning more than 6 Months) while 41.93 % were involved in Marginal activity providing livelihood for less than 6 months. Of 601 workers engaged in Main Work, 118 were cultivators (owner or co-owner) while 4 were Agricultural labourer.

Transport

Rail

Airports

Demographics

As per Population Census 2011, Dooniwari village has population of 1839 citizens of which 961 are males while 878 are females. In Dooniwari, population of children with age 0-6 is 301 which makes up 16.37 % of total population of village. Average Sex Ratio of Dooniwari is 914 females per 1,000 males which is higher than Jammu and Kashmir UT average of 889 females per 1000 males. Child Sex Ratio for the Dooniwari as per census is 691, lower than Jammu and Kashmir average of 862.

Education
Dooniwari has lower literacy rate compared to Jammu and Kashmir. In 2011, literacy rate of Dooniwari village was 59.56 % compared to 67.16 % of Jammu and Kashmir. In Dooniwari Male literacy rate stands at 72.03 % while Female literacy rate was 46.62 %.

See also
Srinagar
Bagati Kani Pora
Zoonipora

References

Budgam district